Rocco Verduci (3 August 1824, Caraffa del Bianco – 2 October 1847, Gerace) was an Italian revolutionary, and martyr of the Insurrection of 1847 in the Two Sicilies. 

In September 1847 Verduci led a rebellion in the district of Gerace, as part of the wider 1847 Insurrection in the Kingdom of the Two Sicilies. The aims of the insurrection were the unification of Italy and the abolition of the monarchy. After having taken over several villages of the district, and proclaimed the suppression of the taxes on imports and exports and the reduction by half of the costs of salt and tobacco, the insurrection was eventually crushed by the arrival of royal troops. The revolutionary leaders, including Verduci, had to flee to the mountains, where they were eventually denounced, arrested, and sentenced to death. Rocco Verduci (aged 23) and four other members of the Gerace Revolt were executed in Gerace on the morning of October 2nd, 1847, and are today remembered as the Five Martyrs of Gerace.

Notes

References 
 Vincenzo Cataldo. 2000. Cospirazioni, Economia e Società nel Distretto di Gerace dal 1847 all'Unità d'Italia. Ardore, Arti Grafiche GS.
 Vittorio Visalli. 1987. Lotta e martirio del popolo calabrese (1847-1848). Edizioni Brenner.

1824 births
1847 deaths
Italian people of the Italian unification
People of the Revolutions of 1848